Drop Dead! (also known as Los Drop Dead and Drop Dead Dreams) was an Alternative rock band from Buenos Aires, Argentina, created by Matyas Mon (its principal composer and lyricist). The original name of the band was "Karma", but they had to change it due to legal issues. They're well known in the local music scene, and abroad, due to its intense and energetic live shows, their melodies, and the use of English to sing in a Spanish language country.

In 2005 they released the video clip for the song Change the Word, second single from the album For Everyone & No One. The video was produced by the band and directed by Emiliano Romero. It featured the performances of Julieta Zylberberg and Rodrigo Pedreira.

In 2011, they tried a comeback, changing its name to The Rebel Robots. In 2015, after a 10 years hiatus, they finally made a comeback.

Band members 
Matyas Mon - lead vocals and guitars (1996–present)

Discography 
 The Black Album (2000)
 A Leaf in the Storm (EP) (2002)
 For Everyone and No One (2003)

References

External links 
 Official website

Argentine rock music groups
Southern cone music
Latin American music